The Polish 9th Fighter Regiment (Polish: 9 Pułk Lotnictwa Myśliwskiego) was a fighter regiment established in 1944 in Malbork that was a part of the Air Force of the Polish Army. The regiment was stationed in Debrzno until it was disbanded on December 31, 2000, in Zegrze Pomorskie.

History 
On August 7, 1944, the Soviet Red Army issued an executive order for the formation of the 1st Mixed Air Corps (Polish: 1 Meszany Korpus Lotniczy) in the regions of Kazan and Kharkiv. The Corps was created from September 1944 to January 1945.

The Corps included the 3rd Fighter Division, which was formed on January 20, 1944 from the 10th Training Brigade of the 2nd Air Army. The division was equipped with fighter aircraft, and placed under the command of Lieutenant Colonel Wasyl Dobraszow in Krasnogród.

On May 11, 1959, the Defense Minister, General Marian Spychalski, made an official state inspection of the regiment. He was accompanied by the Head of General Staff General Jerzy Bordziłowski and Jan Frey-Bielecki, the Commander of the Air Force.
	
From September 28 to October 8, 1959, the regiment participated in the Air Force's championship air games in Wroclaw.

On July 22, 1987, Defense Minister General Florian Siwicki made a surprise inspection of the regiment. After conducting combat preparedness drills and reserve mobilization exercises, he concluded that the regiment showed high efficiency, willingness, and enthusiasm in carrying out their duties

On June 2, 1991, the regiment welcomed Pope John Paul II on behalf of President Lech Wałęsa. During the subsequent Mass, which took place on an air field in Zegrze Pomorskie, the Pope addressed the soldiers, saying, "Ci wszyscy, którzy sprawie Ojczyzny oddani, służą w wojsku, niech uważają siebie za sługi bezpieczeństwa i wolności narodów. Po raz pierwszy dane mi jest - podczas odwiedzin w Ojczyźnie - przemówić do żołnierzy na specjalnym spotkaniu."

On June 14, 1996, President Aleksander Kwaśniewski visited the regiment while he was visiting Koszalin Voivodeship.

Structure 

The regiment consisted of the regimental command and staff, two fighter squadrons, a technical squadron, a supply battalion, and a support and communications battalion. Their proper names, in Polish, were as follows:
 Stanowisko Dowodzenia (Regimental Command)
 Sztab (Staff)
 1 eskadra lotnictwa myśliwskiego (1st fighter squadron)
 2 eskadra lotnictwa myśliwskiego (2nd fighter squadron)
 eskadra techniczna (technical squadron)
 Służba Inżynieryjno-Lotniskowa (SIL)
 Sekcja Przechowywania i Elaboracji Rakiet (SPiER)
 klucz remontu płatowca i silnika
 klucz remontu osprzętu
 klucz remontu Urządzeń Radioelektronicznych
 klucz remontu uzbrojenia
 batalion zaopatrzenia (supply battalion)
 kompania obsługi lotniska
 kompania samochodowa
 kompania ochrony
 batalion łączności i ubezpieczenia lotów (support and communications battalion)
 kompania łączności
 kompania ubezpieczenia lotów
 Węzeł Łączności

The technical squadron had a variety of duties, including servicing airports, storing missiles, and maintaining and refurbishing aircraft, engines, radio and electrical equipment, and weapons. The supply battalion's duties include shuttle service, the upkeep and operation of company cars, and protection.

Equipment 
During the sixty year operating history of the regiment, it operated a number of different Soviet- and Polish-built aircraft. These aircraft were mostly jet fighters and various forms of training aircraft, but also included a single transport helicopter.

 Fighter aircraft:
 Mikoyan-Gurevich MiG-15
 Mikoyan-Gurevich MiG-17
 Mikoyan-Gurevich MiG-21
 Yakovlev Yak-1
 Yakovlev Yak-7
 Yakovlev Yak-9
 Yakovlev Yak-23
 Trainer aircraft:
 Polikarpov Po-2
 PZL TS-8 Bies
 PZL TS-11 Iskra
 PZL-104 Wilga
 Yakovlev Yak-7
 Yakovlev Yak-11
 Transport helicopter:
Antonov An-2

The Regiment operated the Lim-1, Lim-2, and SB Lim-2 versions of the MiG-15, as well as the Lim-5 version of the MiG-17. All Lim-designated MiG aircraft were manufactured in Poland. In addition to the listed aircraft, the regiment also operated the 57 mm AZP S-60 anti-aircraft gun.

Commanders 
 April 11, 1952 - July 2, 1954 - Major Jan Gołubickij
 July 2, 1954 - November 9, 1954 - Capt. Marian Chrzan
 September 9, 1954 - November 18, 1957 - Major Marian Bondzior
 November 18, 1957 - February 24, 1962 - Major Janusz Żywno
 February 24, 1962 - March 13, 1964 - Major Zdzisław Strelau
 March 14, 1964 - December 14, 1966 - Major Stanisław Stalicki
 December 14, 1966 - September 14, 1971 - Lt. Col. Czesław Bil
 September 14, 1971 - February 20, 1974 - Lt. Col. Władysław Pasiewicz
 February 20, 1974 - October 12, 1976 - Lt. Col. Henryk Sygnowski
 October 12, 1976 - June 4, 1983 - Lt. Col. Bogusław Wasilewski
 June 4, 1983 - October 22, 1986 - Lt. Col. Kazimierz Małecki
 October 22, 1986 - February 18, 1989 - Lt. Col. Wojciech Górski
 February 18, 1989 - February 14, 1991 - Lt. Col. Zbigniew Bielewicz
 October 14, 1991 - January 19, 1997 - Lt. Col. Piotr Luśnia
 January 19, 1997 - December 31, 2000 - Lt. Col. Sławomir Kałuziński

Regiments of the Polish Air Force
Military units and formations established in 1944
Military units and formations disestablished in 2000